Dichomeris anisacuminata is a moth of the family Gelechiidae. It was described by Hou-Hun Li and Zhe-Min Zheng in 1996. It is known from Hong Kong and Jiangxi province in China.

The wingspan is 9–12 mm.

References

anisacuminata
Moths described in 1996
Moths of Japan